This is a list of disparaging city nicknames. These pejorative nicknames may be coined for a variety of reasons. Some may be a straightforward desire to slander or disparage the city, while others may be examples of self-deprecating humor. While residents of the cities may see such nicknames as offensive, they may also be reclaimed as positive, even affectionate terms. Still other nicknames may simultaneously serve to attack the city from the outside and as a point of pride for its residents, especially those criticizing local politics.

Etymology of these terms varies. Some are simple portmanteaus of the city name and profanity; others may reference a specific aspect of the city, such as an unfortunate incident in its past.

Canada
 British Columbia
 Vancouver: Blandcouver, Hongcouver, No Fun City, Bamgoober 
 Manitoba
 Winnipeg: Winterpeg
 Transcona: Trashcona
 Ontario
 Toronto: Centre of the Universe, Muddy York, Frozen Swamp

Chile
 Calama: Jalama
 Puerto Montt: Muerto Montt
 Santiago: Santiasco

United Kingdom
 Bradley Stoke: Sadly Broke
 Brighton: Skid-Row-on-Sea
 Bognor Regis: Boghdad
 Edinburgh: Auld Reekie
 Kingston upon Hull: Hull on Earth
 Liverpool: Liverpuddle
 London: The Great Wen, The Smoke
 Manchester: Gunchester
 Moss Side: Baby Beirut
 Nottingham: Shottingham
 Salford: Dirty Old Town
 Scunthorpe: Scumthorpe
 Sheffield: People's Republic of South Yorkshire
 Stevenage New Town: Silkingrad

United States
 Alabama: Alabummer
 Birmingham: The Tragic City
 California: Land of fruits and nuts
 Berkeley: Berzerkeley, The People's Republic of Berkeley
 Davis: People's Republic of Davis
 San Francisco: San Franpsycho
 Los Angeles: La-La Land
 Redwood City: Deadwood City
 Sacramento: Suckramento
 Santa Monica: People's Republic of Santa Monica
 Colorado
 Boulder: The People's Republic of Boulder
 Lafayette: Laugh at It
 Illinois: Illnoise, Suburban Chicago, Land'o'Lincoln (considered disparaging in the pre-Civil Rights South)
 Chicago: Beirut by the Lake, Chiberia, Chi-raq, Second City, Shitcago
 Indiana
 Indianapolis: India-no-place
 Kansas
 Dodge City: The Wickedest Little City in America
 Louisiana: Loserana
 New Orleans: The Big Sleazy
 Maryland
 Baltimore: "Bodymore, Murderland", The City That Bleeds, Harm City, Mob Town
 Takoma Park: The People's Republic of Takoma Park
 Massachusetts: Taxachusetts
 Cambridge: The People's Republic of Cambridge
 Somerville: Slummerville
 Worcester: Wormtown
 Nevada
 Las Vegas: Lost Wages
 New Hampshire
 Concord: The City in a Coma
 New Jersey
 Asbury Park: The Dark City
 Dumont: The Dirty D
 New Mexico
 Gallup: Drunk Driving Capital of America
 New York
 Albany: Smallbany
 Amsterdam: Amsterico
 Auburn: The Prison City
 New York City: Hymietown, The Modern Gomorrah, New York Shitty
 Staten Island: The Forgotten Borough
 Rochester: Rottenchester
 Utica: The City That God Forgot
 Yonkers: Junkers
 North Carolina
 Fayetteville: Torture Town
 Greensboro: Greensboring
 North Dakota
 Minot: Mindrot
 Ohio
 Cincinnati: Cincinasty
 Cleveland: The Sleepy City, The Mistake on the Lake
 Dayton: Little Detroit
 Youngstown: Murdertown
 Oregon
 Astoria, Oregon: ASS-toria
 Portland: Little Beirut
 Portland, Oregon : Porn-land
 Pennsylvania
 Philadelphia: Filthadelphia, Filthydelphia, or Killadelphia
 Pittsburgh: Shittsburgh
 Texas: Texass, The Big Tumbleweed, South of Sane, Land of the Giant Spiders
 Dallas: Dallass, South Oklahoma
 Houston: Baghdad on the Bayou
 Utah
 Salt Lake City: SL,UT
 Vermont
 Burlington: The People's Republic of Burlington
 Washington, DC: Hollywood for Ugly People, Murder Capital of America
 Washington
 Aberdeen: Port of Missing Men
 Spokane: Spokanistan
 Tacoma: Tackyoma

See also
 Big Smoke (disambiguation), a disparaging nickname for several cities
 Dysphemism
 Lists of nicknames
 Satiric misspelling

Notes

References

Disparaging